Comilla Modern High School is a combined school in Comilla, a city in Bangladesh. It was established in 1993. It is situated in Nazrul avenue. The Education Institute Identification Number (EIIN) of the school is 105767.

History 
The school, in the centre of Comilla, was established in 1992. The school was established in 155 sotok area. The official study session was started in 1993. Although there is a doubt about the founder. According to Md. Abdur Rauf (Chairman of Comilla Adarsha Sadar Upazila & President of Bangladesh College Teachers' Association), the founder of the school is Late Mohammad Abdul Kuddus, Ekushey Padak Winner. But Afzal Khan's name is written on the school's signboard.

Initially the school conducted only one shift. From 1997 two shifts were introduced: morning and day. Presently morning shift is for girls' and day shift is for boys'. Each shift is headed by an assistant head master. 5,123 students are studying in the school with 112 teachers. The number of teachers in morning shift are 54 and in day shift are 60. Morning shift starts in 7:00am up to 12:00pm then day shift continues in 12.30pm up to 5.30pm.

Facilities 
The school has three academic buildings, an administrative building. There is a field in the school arena. Other facilities include workshop, auditorium, canteen, and library. There are fifty teachers and twenty staff. The school has two laboratories.

The uniform is for boys; a white shirt with navy blue full trousers and white shoes and for girls; navy blue kameez with white shalwar and white shoes. The school monogram is printed on the shirt pocket.

Usually students are admitted in class 6. Admission can be considered in other classes if a vacancy is available or if someone is transferred from some other government school. The admission test is usually taken in the first week of January.

Academic performance

The JSC and SSC examinations are conducted by the Board of Secondary and Intermediate Education under the Ministry of Education. Junior School Certificate (JSC) is a public examination taken by students in Bangladesh after successful completion of eight years of schooling and Secondary School Certificate (SSC) is the diploma awarded for the completion of grade ten, which is equivalent to the O Levels in the UK. The JSC examination consists of nine subjects totalling 900 marks, with each subject given 100 marks and the SSC examination consists of eleven subjects totalling 1,100 marks, with each subject given 100 marks, including practical tests for science subjects. A minimum of 33 marks are required to pass each subject. Subjects will depend on which major program a student has elected to study. These major programs are Sciences; Arts and Humanities; and Business Studies. Students have to elect one of these three programs just before enrolment in the 9th grade for SSC. Results of both the exams are published in the form of a GPA. The highest score is GPA-5.

JSC results
Results from 2010 to 2012 for the Junior School Certificate level examinations are as follows:

SSC results

Results from 2006 to 2013 for the Secondary School Certificate level examinations are as follows:

Extracurricular activities 
 BNCC (Bangladesh National Cadet Core)
 Scouting
 Games and sports (mostly athletics, cricket, Badminton and football)
 Debating
 Math and language competitions.
 Picnic
 Social Development

See also
 Education in Bangladesh
 List of universities and schools in Comilla
 List of schools in Bangladesh
 List of Educational Institutions in Comilla

References

External links

High schools in Bangladesh
Schools in Comilla District
Educational institutions established in 1993
1993 establishments in Bangladesh